Agulis (or Augulis, Aguillar, or Akoulis) was a historical Armenian village located in the Nakhichevan region of present-day Azerbaijan. The village played an essential role in Armenian history due to its cultural, strategic, and historical significance. Dozens of Armenian churches existed up until 1919 when the Armenian population was massacred by Azeri and Turkish soldiers and which resulted in the destruction of the town.

History
Agulis was an important center of Armenian culture and learning. The village was home to several notable Armenian schools, monasteries, and churches, including the Surb Astvatsatsin Church, also known as the Church of the Holy Mother of God, which was built in the 17th century. The church is known for its unique architectural design and its impressive wall paintings. The village was also home to several renowned Armenian scholars, writers, and religious leaders, including Mkhitar Gosh, who was born in Agulis and went on to become a prominent medieval Armenian scholar, lawyer, and statesman. During the 13th and 14th centuries trade among Asia Minor and Italy was provided mainly by Armenians, also many Armenian families in Agulis and Siunik were involved in the Italian trade.

As a strategic fortress town, Agulis played a vital role in the defense of the Armenian kingdom against foreign invaders. The village was located along the border of the Armenian and Persian empires and was frequently attacked and occupied by hostile forces. Despite these challenges, Agulis remained a symbol of Armenian resistance and resilience for centuries. During the Seljuk invasion of Armenia in the 11th century, the village became a refuge for Armenian monks and scholars, and it played a significant role in preserving Armenian culture and language during a time of crisis.

During the 19th and early 20th centuries, Agulis was part of the Russian Empire, and it experienced a period of relative stability and prosperity. However, during World War I, the Ottoman Empire, which controlled present-day Azerbaijan, launched a campaign of genocide against the Armenian people. The Armenians of Agulis were among the many victims of this atrocity, and the village was destroyed, and its Armenian population was forced to leave.

A map created by the USSR General Staff in 1977 marks several burial grounds and numerous ruins, although pinpointing medieval cemeteries poses significant difficulties. In Agulis, for instance, there were around 2,000 historical tombstones, and Ayvazyan had photographed and drawn many of them during the 1970s and 1980s.

See also
Agulis massacre
Zok Language
Saint Thomas Monastery of Agulis
St. Tovma Monastery (Chalkhangala)

References

External links
Agulis Town on Armeniapedia

History of Armenia
Villages in Azerbaijan